Maria Josefina Karlsson (born 8 February 1985) is a Swedish former footballer. Her last club was AS Saint-Étienne of France's Division 1 Féminine, where she played as a defender. Karlsson currently works as an agent for the Swedish sport agency Connect Management Group, CMG.

Club career
Karlsson played for Kopparbergs/Göteborg FC (2002–2008) and Linköpings FC (2009–2010). After signing for Linköpings, Karlsson was known as Maria Karlsson II, or Maria "Kalle" Karlsson due to the presence of senior teammate and namesake Maria "Kia" Karlsson. Karlsson made 154 appearances in the Damallsvenskan, the highest level of women's football in Sweden. She won a League and Cup double with Linköping in 2009. She also played in the UEFA Women's Champions League in 2009 and 2010.

In January 2011 Karlsson became the first Swede to sign for a club in the new FA WSL. After a successful trial, she signed a deal to play for Doncaster Rovers Belles while living at the Ramada Jarvis hotel in Doncaster. At the end of the English season Karlsson returned to Sweden, signing for Jitex BK. After six Damallsvenskan appearances and one goal, in November 2011 Karlsson revealed she had departed Jitex and was considering a contract offer from Italian club Bardolino Verona. She signed a six-month deal to commence on 1 January 2012.

After moving on to Brescia, Karlsson transferred to French Division 1 Féminine team AS Saint-Étienne in August 2015.

International career
Karlsson won a total of 57 caps with Sweden at youth level. These comprised eight caps at Under–17 level, 24 at Under–19 level and 25 at Under–21/23 level.

See also

 Foreign players in the FA WSL

References

External links
 The FA SuperLeague site
 Footofeminin profile 
 
  (archive)

1985 births
Living people
Footballers from Gothenburg
Doncaster Rovers Belles L.F.C. players
Swedish women's footballers
Swedish expatriate women's footballers
Women's Super League players
Expatriate women's footballers in England
Expatriate women's footballers in Italy
Expatriate women's footballers in France
Swedish expatriate sportspeople in England
Swedish expatriate sportspeople in Italy
Swedish expatriate sportspeople in France
Damallsvenskan players
BK Häcken FF players
Jitex BK players
Linköpings FC players
Serie A (women's football) players
A.S.D. AGSM Verona F.C. players
A.C.F. Brescia Calcio Femminile players
AS Saint-Étienne (women) players
Women's association football defenders
Women's association football midfielders